Trần Thị Thùy Dung  (born February 18, 1990 in Đà Nẵng, Việt Nam) was crowned as Miss Vietnam 2008 on August 31 in Hội An. Miss Vietnam 2008 Tran Thi Thuy Dung was the tallest contestant (1,78m - 2008) with body measurements 86 - 61,5- 91. However, Thuy Dung is not allowed to represent her country in Miss World 2008, in Johannesburg, South Africa, on December 13 due to her unlegalized highschool graduate certificate.

The first runner-up is Phan Hoàng Minh Thư from Đà Lạt (Lâm Đồng Province) and the second runner-up is Nguyễn Thụy Vân from Hà Nội.

Awards
The winner of the pageant receives VND150 million (US$9,041) in cash, an overseas trip and the right to compete in the Miss World pageant in South Africa later this year.

She will also serve as the country’s ambassador for the “social security for the poor” program initiated by the Vietnam Bank for Investment and Development (BIDV).

Miss Vietnam 2008
Miss Vietnam 2008: Tran Thi Thuy Dung

First runner-up: Phan Hoang Minh Thu

Second runner-up: Nguyen Thuy Van

Top 5 others: Lam Thu Hang, Dau Thi Hong Phuc

Miss Photo: Thach Thi Hong Nhung

Miss Sea: Lam Thu Hang

Miss Friendly: Dau Thi Hong Phuc

Best in Ao dai: Le Thi May

The Audience’s Prize: Vu Hoang Diep

Best Answer: Nguyen Thuy Van

The top 10 beauties were chosen after 30 contestants performed in ao dai, swimwear and night gowns including: Tran Thi Thuy Dung, Phan Hoang Minh Thu, Nguyen Thuy Van, Lam Thu Hang, Dau thi Hong Phuc, Phan Thi Diem Chau, Trinh Thi Minh Hue, Nguyen Linh Chi, Vo Thi Le Thu and Nguyen Hong Nhung.

References

External links
 Forums (Website) of Miss Vietnam 2008 Tran Thi Thuy Dung (Thuydung.com)
 Miss Vietnam 2008 Tran Thi Thuy Dung in bi-ki-ni
 Miss Vietnam 2008 Tran Thi Thuy Dung in Ao dai

Living people
1990 births
Miss Vietnam winners
2008 in Vietnam
People from Da Nang
Vietnamese female models
21st-century Vietnamese women